Estadio Banco Guayaquil, sometimes known as Estadio Independiente del Valle, is a football stadium in Quito, Ecuador. It is currently used on club level by owner Independiente del Valle and their reserve team Independiente Juniors. The stadium has a capacity of 12,000 spectators.

History
Independiente del Valle's project to build a stadium was revealed by his general manager Santiago Morales in October 2019. The construction of the stadium started in October 2020, and the club presented the name of the stadium on 18 February 2021, after being sponsored by Banco Guayaquil.

The stadium's first match occurred on 20 March 2021, as IDV faced Delfín, with Lorenzo Faravelli scoring its first goal as the match ended 2–0 for the hosts. The lights were installed in June, with the stadium hosting matches of CONMEBOL competitions shortly after.

References

External links
Soccerway stadium profile

C.S.D. Independiente del Valle
Football venues in Ecuador
Buildings and structures in Quito